The 2012 Super Copa Telcel was the second season of this championship, part of the Mexican branch of SEAT León Supercopa. Reigning champion Ricardo Pérez de Lara won the series for a second time. Trofeo Ibiza was a supported event running SEAT Ibiza Cupra Turbo 1.4L.

Cars

All the cars were SEAT Leon FWD.

Continental supplied the tires.

Drivers

In this year is expect to increase to 20 cars respect the 16 of the 2011 season. Rubén Rovelo, Marco Santibáñez, Gabriel Iemma, César Tiberio Jiménez and Alfonso Celis have confirmed their participation.

Schedule

Calendar changes
Guadalajara and Aguascalientes will be venue for races for first time.

Results

Races

 The 8th place in the first race is the pole position in the second race.

Standings

References

Super Copa